Good Feeling is the fourteenth solo studio album by the English singer-songwriter Paul Carrack. It was originally released in 2012 on Carrack's own Carrack-UK label and peaked at number 46 on the UK Albums Chart, making Good Feeling Carrack's highest charting solo album to that time.

Carrack originally recorded the song "From Now On" on his 1982 LP Suburban Voodoo; the version on Good Feeling is an entirely new recording.

Reception

AllMusic's Stephen Thomas Erlewine calls Good Feeling "a bright, bouncing collection of blue-eyed soul. Perhaps the production is just a shade too clean -- it not only has a bright gloss but not a note is out of place, everybody is in the pocket -- but there's also a genuine warmth to Carrack's music, derived not just from his honeyed voice but from the precision of his seasoned backing band."

Track listing

Personnel
Musicians
 Paul Carrack – all vocals, keyboards, bass, guitars, percussion
 Alex Tinlin – guitars (6), backing vocals (6)
 Rolf Tinlin – mandolin (6), backing vocals (6)
 Jack Carrack – drums
 Steve Beighton – saxophones

Production
 Paul Carrack – producer
 Rupert Cobb – editing, mixing
 Ian Ross – design 
 Andrea Hunnicutt – photography

References

External links
 

2012 albums
Paul Carrack albums